St. Charles Community College (SCC) is a public community college in St. Charles, Missouri. Established in 1986, SCC's first fall semester in 1987 had an enrollment of 1,547 students.  It offers associate degrees and certificate programs in the arts, business, sciences, and career-technical fields as well as workforce training and community-based personal and professional development. St. Charles Community College is accredited by The Higher Learning Commission of the North Central Association of Colleges and Schools.

Academics
SCC offers many majors, degrees and certificates.

Two-year associate’s degrees
A transfer program that provides pathways to four-year universities after two years of coursework at SCC
Certificate programs 
Specialized trainings
Non-credit courses

Athletics

The school fields four intercollegiate sports teams. Soccer and baseball for men along with soccer and softball for women. St. Charles Community College is a member of the National Junior College Athletic Association (NJCAA) and competes at the division I level in all four sports. All four Cougar teams are members of the Missouri Community College Athletic Conference (MCCAC).

Campuses

SCC's main campus on Mid Rivers Mall Drive has 14 buildings:

Administration Building (ADM)
Campus Store *New location in the Student Center Building
Campus Lake Apartments
College Building (CB)
Campus Services Building (CS)
College Center (CC)
Daniel J. Conoyer Social Sciences Building (SSB)
Department of Public Service
Donald D. Shook Fine Arts Building (FAB)
John M. McGuire Humanities Building (HUM)
Learning Resource Center (LRC)
Student Center (SC)
Technology Building (TECH)
Visual Arts Building (VAB)

The 14 campus buildings are connected by a central pedestrian plaza and internal courtyards.

The main campus also features a .67-mile walking and biking trail and a storybook walk presented by St. Charles City-County Library and the SCC Foundation. The trail was completed by Great Rivers Greenway in the fall of 2013 as part of the Dardenne Greenway Trail, linking trails from Legacy Park in Cottleville to Woodlands Sports Park and Rabbit Run Park in St. Peters.

SCC's second campus, The Center for Healthy Living, is located at One Academy Place in Dardenne Prairie. The location houses credit and non-credit programs in healthcare and agriculture.

Student life

Student Senate
SGA is the official student governing body of SCC. Student Senate serves as an advocate for the interests of SCC students and regularly presents concerns and issues to the College Board of Trustees. Senators are chosen by both general election and appointment procedures.

Activities
There are more than 45 student organized clubs and organizations offered through the Student Activities Office at SCC.

Mascot
The Mascot for SCC is an anthropomorphic cougar named Scooter McCougar. Scooter makes regular appearances at campus celebrations, sporting events and on social media.

References

External links
 
 Official athletics website

Educational institutions established in 1986
Community colleges in Missouri
Buildings and structures in St. Charles County, Missouri
Education in St. Charles County, Missouri
1986 establishments in Missouri
NJCAA athletics